Power Construction Corporation of China, branded as PowerChina, is a wholly State-owned company administered by the State-owned Assets Supervision and Administration Commission and part of the heavy and civil engineering construction industry. PowerChina consists of 779 companies. In 2020, PowerChina ranked 157 among Fortune Global 500 companies and 41 among Top 500 Enterprises of China.

PowerChina overseas brands include Sinohydro, HydroChina, SEPCO and SEPCO III. PowerChina has involvement in over 100 countries including involvement in projects such as

 HydroChina Dawood Wind Power Project, Pakistan
 Nam Ou river cascade dams, Laos
 Dau Tieng Solar Power Project, Vietnam
 Melaka Gateway, Malaysia
 Lamu Coal Power Station, Kenya
 Ayago Hydroelectric Power Station, Uganda
 Merowe Dam, Sudan
 Pwalugu Hydroelectric Power Station, Ghana
 Pakistan Port Qasim Power Project
 Zimbabwe-Zimbabwe Plant
 Upgrade of Highway 2, Israel

Involvement with projects within China includes the Three Gorges Project, Zouxian Power Station, Longyuan Rudong Intertidal Wind Farm and the Beijing–Shanghai high-speed railway.

In November 2020, Yan Zhiyong, chairman of the PowerChina, as well as Chinese state media, announced the construction of a "super" dam on the Yarlung Zangbo, three times larger than the current largest hydroelectric project in the world, also Chinese, the Three Gorges Project.

References 

Government-owned companies of China
Chinese companies established in 2009